Harrison Parker Tyler (March 6, 1904 – June 1974), was an American author, poet, and film critic. Tyler had a relationship with underground filmmaker Charles Boultenhouse (1926–1994) from 1945 until his death. Their papers are held by the New York Public Library. In 1997, cultural critic Camille Paglia described Tyler as her favorite critic and the biggest influence on her own film criticism, writing that like Tyler, she "[is] primarily a myth-critic and pagan cultist".

He appeared in Maya Deren's At Land (1944), a 15-minute silent experimental film.

Writings
He wrote The Young and Evil (Paris: Obelisk Press, 1933) with Charles Henri Ford, an energetically experimental novel with obvious debts to fellow Villager Djuna Barnes, and also to Gertrude Stein. Tyler and Ford co-edited the Surrealist magazine View until it folded in 1947. A writer for the journal Film Culture, Tyler is one of the few film critics to write extensively on experimental film and underground film. From its inception in 1946, Tyler was film commentator for the historic film society Cinema 16 founded by Amos Vogel. His Screening the Sexes: Homosexuality in the Movies (New York: Holt, Rinehart & Winston, 1972) was one of the first books about homosexuality and film, preceding Vito Russo's The Celluloid Closet (1981).
His books of film criticism include:
 The Hollywood Hallucination (New York: Creative Age, 1944)
 Magic and Myth of the Movies (New York: Henry Holt and Company, 1947)
 Chaplin: Last of the Clowns (New York: The Vanguard Press, 1948)
 The Three Faces of the Film: the Art, the Dream, the Cult (New York: Thomas Yoseloff, 1960)
 Classics of the Foreign Film: A Pictorial Treasury (Secaucus, NJ: Citadel Press, 1962)
 Sex Psyche Etcetera in the Film (New York: Horizon Press, 1969)
 The Divine Comedy of Pavel Tchelitchew: A Biography (Fleet Publishing, 1967)
 Underground Film: A Critical History (New York: Grove Press, 1969)
 Screening the Sexes: Homosexuality in the Movies (New York: Holt, Rinehart & Winston, 1972)
 The Shadow of an Airplane Climbs the Empire State Building (Garden City, NY: Doubleday, 1973)
 A Pictorial History of Sex in Films (Secaucus, NJ: Citadel Press, 1974)

He often wrote for the View, the Kenyon Review, Partisan Review, Evergreen Review, and the cineaste magazines Film Culture, and Film Quarterly. Some of his books are collections of his magazine work. He received a Longview Award for Poetry in 1958. He wrote a biography about modernist painter Florine Stettheimer.

Tyler was mentioned several times in the novel Myra Breckinridge (1968) by Gore Vidal, bringing renewed attention to Tyler's film criticism. This led Vidal to claim that "I've done for [Tyler] what Edward Albee did for Virginia Woolf" after The Hollywood Hallucination and Magic and Myth of the Movies were republished in 1970.

Black Sparrow Press published his poetry, including a complete and corrected text of The Granite Butterfly, first published with Bern Porter, Berkeley, Calif., 1945, as The Will of Eros: Selected Poems 1930–1970 (Los Angeles: Black Sparrow Press, 1972).

References

External links
 Parker Tyler Collection at the Harry Ransom Center

1904 births
1974 deaths
American LGBT poets
LGBT people from Louisiana
20th-century American poets
American male poets
American film critics
20th-century American LGBT people